Cressida Campbell (born 8 July 1960) is an Australian artist.

She was born in Sydney in 1960 to Ruth and Ross Campbell. She studied at East Sydney Technical College in 1978 and 1979. Her older sister is actress Nell Campbell.

Her husband Peter died in 2011. She lives in the Sydney suburb of Bronte, in her home studio.

Career

Campbell spent several weeks at the Yoshida Hanga Academy in Tokyo in 1985.  From this she learned how to lead the eye around the picture plane using composition.

She exhibited in London in 2001 (when Germaine Greer introduced her at the opening) and 2003. As of 2006, her technique centers on painting her woodblocks in preparation for hand-printing with them. She is described as following in the footsteps of Margaret Preston and Thea Proctor.

Literature
The Woodblock Painting of Cressida Campbell with an introduction by John McDonald, art critic of The Sydney Morning Herald and a foreword by Edmund Capon, director of the Art Gallery of New South Wales, 360 pp. Hardback.

In Collections
Campbell’s work is held in the following collections: Art Gallery of New South Wales (9 works), the National Gallery of Australia (4 works).

References

External links
Cressida Campbell web site
Cressida Campbell at the National Gallery of Australia database
Cressida Campbell: A Profile
AGNSW: Cressida Campbell (with images of the 9 works held)
Google Images: Cressida Campbell and her works

1960 births
Australian women artists
Living people
Artists from Sydney
Date of birth missing (living people)
National Art School alumni